Arezki Aissi (born April 21, 2004 in Algiers, Algeria) is an Algerian footballer who plays as a forward for USMA in the Algerian Ligue Professionnelle 2.

Club career
2006–2008 ES Sétif 
2006–2009 CA Bordj Bou Arreridj 
2009–2010 USM El Harrach 
2010–pres. US Biskra

Honours
Won the Algerian League with ES Sétif in 2007
Won the Arab Champions League with ES Sétif in 2007 and 2008

See also
Football in Algeria
List of football clubs in Algeria

References

Algerian footballers
Kabyle people
Footballers from Sétif
US Biskra players
Algerian Ligue 2 players
CA Bordj Bou Arréridj players
USM El Harrach players
1988 births
Living people
Association football forwards
21st-century Algerian people